The Freedom of Association and Protection of the Right to Organise Convention (1948) No 87 is an International Labour Organization Convention, and one of eight conventions that form the core of international labour law, as interpreted by the Declaration on Fundamental Principles and Rights at Work.

Content 
The Freedom of Association and Protection of the Right to Organise Convention comprises the preamble followed by four parts with a total of 21 articles. The preamble consists of the formal introduction of the instrument, at the Thirty-first Session of the General Conference of the International Labour Organization, on 17 June 1948. A statement of the "considerations" leading to the establishment of the document. These considerations include the preamble to the Constitution of the International Labour Organization; the affirmation of the Declaration of Philadelphia in regard to the issue; and the request by the General Assembly of the United Nations, upon endorsing the previously received report of 1947, to "continue every effort in order that it may be possible to adopt one or several international Conventions." In closing, the preamble states the date of adoption: July 9, 1948.

Part 1 consists of ten articles which outline the rights of both worker and employers to "join organisations of their own choosing without previous authorisation." Rights are also extended to the organizations themselves to draw up rules and constitutions, vote for officers, and organize administrative functions without interference from public authorities. There is also an explicit expectation placed on these organizations. They are required, in the exercise of these rights, to respect the law of the land. In turn, the law of the land, "shall not be such as to impair, nor shall it be so applied as to impair, the guarantees provided for in this Convention." Finally, article 9 states that these provisions are applied to both armed forces and police forces only as determined by national laws and regulations, and do not supersede previous national laws that reflect the same rights for such forces. Article 1 states all ILO members must give effect to the following provisions.

Part 2 states that every ILO member undertakes to ensure "all necessary and appropriate measures to ensure that workers and employers may exercise freely the right to organise." This sentence is expanded upon in the Right to Organise and Collective Bargaining Convention, 1949.

Part 3, which contains articles 12 and 13, deals with technical matters related to the Convention. It outlines the definitions of who may accept (with or without modification), or reject the obligations of this Convention with regards to "non-metropolitan territory[ies]", whose self-governing powers extend into this area. It also discusses reporting procedures for modification of previous declarations in regard to  acceptance of these obligations. Part 4 outlines the procedures for formal ratification of the Convention. The Convention was declared to come into force twelve months from the date when the Director-General had been notified of ratification by two member countries. This date became July 4, 1950, one year after Norway (preceded by Sweden) ratified the Convention. Part 4 also outlines provisions for denunciation of the Convention, including a ten-year cycle of obligation. Final discussion highlights procedures which would take place in the event that the Convention is eventually superseded by a new Convention, in whole, or in part.

Ratifications 

As of January 2023, 157 out of 187 ILO member states have ratified the convention:

See also 

 International labour law
 Declaration on Fundamental Principles and Rights at Work
 UK labour law

References

External links 
 ratifications
 Text of the Convention  at the Center for a World in Balance

Freedom of association
International Labour Organization conventions
Treaties concluded in 1948
Treaties entered into force in 1950
Treaties of the People's Socialist Republic of Albania
Treaties of Algeria
Treaties of Angola
Treaties of Antigua and Barbuda
Treaties of Argentina
Treaties of Armenia
Treaties of Australia
Treaties of Austria
Treaties of Azerbaijan
Treaties of the Bahamas
Treaties of Bangladesh
Treaties of Barbados
Treaties of the Byelorussian Soviet Socialist Republic
Treaties of Belgium
Treaties of Belize
Treaties of the Republic of Dahomey
Treaties of Bolivia
Treaties of Bosnia and Herzegovina
Treaties of Botswana
Treaties of the People's Republic of Bulgaria
Treaties of Burkina Faso
Treaties of Myanmar
Treaties of Burundi
Treaties of Cambodia
Treaties of Cameroon
Treaties of Canada
Treaties of Cape Verde
Treaties of the Central African Republic
Treaties of Chad
Treaties of Chile
Treaties of Colombia
Treaties of the Comoros
Treaties of the Democratic Republic of the Congo
Treaties of the Republic of the Congo
Treaties of Costa Rica
Treaties of Ivory Coast
Treaties of Croatia
Treaties of Cuba
Treaties of Cyprus
Treaties of the Czech Republic
Treaties of Czechoslovakia
Treaties of Denmark
Treaties of Djibouti
Treaties of Dominica
Treaties of the Dominican Republic
Treaties of East Timor
Treaties of Ecuador
Treaties of the Republic of Egypt (1953–1958)
Treaties of El Salvador
Treaties of Equatorial Guinea
Treaties of Eritrea
Treaties of Estonia
Treaties of the Ethiopian Empire
Treaties of Fiji
Treaties of Finland
Treaties of the French Fourth Republic
Treaties of Gabon
Treaties of the Gambia
Treaties of Georgia (country)
Treaties of West Germany
Treaties of East Germany
Treaties of Ghana
Treaties of the Kingdom of Greece
Treaties of Grenada
Treaties of Guatemala
Treaties of Guinea-Bissau
Treaties of Haiti
Treaties of Honduras
Treaties of the Hungarian People's Republic
Treaties of Iceland
Treaties of Indonesia
Treaties of Ireland
Treaties of Israel
Treaties of Italy
Treaties of Jamaica
Treaties of Japan
Treaties of Kazakhstan
Treaties of Kiribati
Treaties of Kuwait
Treaties of Kyrgyzstan
Treaties of Latvia
Treaties of Lesotho
Treaties of Liberia
Treaties of the Libyan Arab Jamahiriya
Treaties of Lithuania
Treaties of Luxembourg
Treaties of North Macedonia
Treaties of Madagascar
Treaties of Malawi
Treaties of Mali
Treaties of Malta
Treaties of Mauritania
Treaties of Mauritius
Treaties of Mexico
Treaties of Moldova
Treaties of the Mongolian People's Republic
Treaties of Montenegro
Treaties of Mozambique
Treaties of Namibia
Treaties of the Netherlands
Treaties of Nicaragua
Treaties of Niger
Treaties of Nigeria
Treaties of Norway
Treaties of the Dominion of Pakistan
Treaties of Panama
Treaties of Papua New Guinea
Treaties of Paraguay
Treaties of Peru
Treaties of the Philippines
Treaties of the Polish People's Republic
Treaties of Portugal
Treaties of the Socialist Republic of Romania
Treaties of Rwanda
Treaties of Saint Kitts and Nevis
Treaties of Saint Lucia
Treaties of Saint Vincent and the Grenadines
Treaties of Samoa
Treaties of San Marino
Treaties of São Tomé and Príncipe
Treaties of Senegal
Treaties of Serbia and Montenegro
Treaties of Seychelles
Treaties of Sierra Leone
Treaties of Slovakia
Treaties of Slovenia
Treaties of the Solomon Islands
Treaties of Somalia
Treaties of South Africa
Treaties of the Soviet Union
Treaties of Spain
Treaties of Sri Lanka
Treaties of Suriname
Treaties of Eswatini
Treaties of Sweden
Treaties of Switzerland
Treaties of the United Arab Republic
Treaties of Tajikistan
Treaties of Tanzania
Treaties of Togo
Treaties of Trinidad and Tobago
Treaties of Tunisia
Treaties of Turkey
Treaties of Turkmenistan
Treaties of Uganda
Treaties of the Ukrainian Soviet Socialist Republic
Treaties of the United Kingdom
Treaties of Uruguay
Treaties of Uzbekistan
Treaties of Vanuatu
Treaties of Venezuela
Treaties of Yemen
Treaties of Yugoslavia
Treaties of Zambia
Treaties of Zimbabwe
Treaties extended to Norfolk Island
Treaties extended to Curaçao and Dependencies
Treaties extended to the Faroe Islands
Treaties extended to Greenland
Treaties extended to the French Southern and Antarctic Lands
Treaties extended to French Somaliland
Treaties extended to French Guiana
Treaties extended to French Polynesia
Treaties extended to Guadeloupe
Treaties extended to Martinique
Treaties extended to Réunion
Treaties extended to Saint Pierre and Miquelon
Treaties extended to New Caledonia
Treaties extended to the Colony of Aden
Treaties extended to the West Indies Federation
Treaties extended to the Colony of the Bahamas
Treaties extended to British Honduras
Treaties extended to Bermuda
Treaties extended to the Bechuanaland Protectorate
Treaties extended to the Colony of North Borneo
Treaties extended to the British Virgin Islands
Treaties extended to the Falkland Islands
Treaties extended to the Colony of Fiji
Treaties extended to the Gambia Colony and Protectorate
Treaties extended to Gibraltar
Treaties extended to Guernsey
Treaties extended to British Guiana
Treaties extended to Jersey
Treaties extended to the Gilbert and Ellice Islands
Treaties extended to Basutoland
Treaties extended to the Federation of Rhodesia and Nyasaland
Treaties extended to the Colony and Protectorate of Nigeria
Treaties extended to Saint Helena, Ascension and Tristan da Cunha
Treaties extended to the Colony of Sarawak
Treaties extended to the Crown Colony of Seychelles
Treaties extended to the Colony of Sierra Leone
Treaties extended to Swaziland (protectorate)
Treaties extended to the Uganda Protectorate
Treaties extended to the Sultanate of Zanzibar
Treaties extended to the Aden Protectorate
1948 in labor relations